Heneage Finch, 5th Earl of Aylesford (24 April 1786 – 3 January 1859) was a British peer, the eldest son of Heneage Finch, 4th Earl of Aylesford.

He was styled Lord Guernsey until he succeeded his father in 1812.

Aylesford married in 1821 Augusta Sophia Greville, daughter of George Greville, 2nd Earl of Warwick. His children included Augusta Finch who was born in 1822 and be came a philanthropist and Countess of Dartmouth.

He was High Steward of Sutton Coldfield from 1835 until his death.

References

External links

1786 births
1859 deaths
9th Queen's Royal Lancers officers
Deputy Lieutenants of Warwickshire
5
Members of the Parliament of the United Kingdom for English constituencies
UK MPs 1807–1812
Aylesford, E5
Heneage